Tuckaleechee Caverns is a tourist attraction and the largest and highest rated cave or caverns by AAA East of the Mississippi river.  Tuckaleechee runs under the Smoky Mountains National Park to Townsend, Tennessee. The caverns were discovered in the mid-19th century and were opened to the public by Bill Vananda and Harry Myers in 1953. The caverns are known for the Big Room that could almost fit a football stadium inside it. The "Big Room", is a immense cave/cavern room with many stalagmites reaching 24 feet tall with flow-stone formations hundreds of feet in length and width.

Tuckaleechee Caverns also has the tallest underground waterfall named "Silver Falls", a 210-foot two-tier waterfall. The cavern originates at White Oak Sinks in the Great Smoky Mountains National Park. The Caverns also host a seismograph system monitored by the United States Department of Defense and the United States Geological Survey (USGS).

References

 https://www.ctbto.org/verification-regime/featured-stations/types/auxiliary-seismic/as107-tuckaleechee-cavernstennessee-united-states/
 https://www.usgs.gov/
http://www.aaa.com/travelinfo/tennessee/townsend/attractions/tuckaleechee-caverns-513885.html

External links
 

Caves of Tennessee
Townsend, Tennessee
Tourist attractions in Blount County, Tennessee
Landforms of Blount County, Tennessee